Sanjay Uttamrao Deshmukh (born 21 April 1968) is an Indian politician. He was a member of the Maharashtra Legislative Assembly from the Digras constituency of Maharashtra in 1999. In between, he also served as the State Minister of Sports of Maharashtra from 2002 to 2004. In 2004 he again got elected as Independent MLA of Digras. He is the founder of Ishwar Deshmukh Foundation. He is also a Director of Yavatmal District Centralized Cooperative Bank, of Digras branch.

Early life and background 
Sanjay Uttamrao Deshmukh, also called Sanjay Bhau, was born in a traditional Marathi family in Chincholi on 21 April 1968. He is one of the four children of late Shri. Uttamrao Deshmukh (Police Patil) and Smt.Savitabai Deshmukh. He completed his schooling from Dinbai Vidyalaya, Digras. He completed his graduation in Bachelor of commerce from Amrawati University. He is married to Mrs.Vaishalitai Sanjayrao Deshmukh. The couple has two children.

Political career 
Sanjay Uttamrao Deshmukh was the first member of his family who joined politics. His dedication to serving society made him join politics at the early age of 30. He first won the election of Digras constituency in 1999 with 26415 votes as an Independent MLA. Meanwhile, he was also served as Minister of Sports from 2002 to 2004. In 2004 he was again elected as an Independent MLA of Digras.

After that, his success in politics and his followers never stop rising; In 2001, he became the State Sports Minister of Maharashtra. From the beginning days of politics, he has been involved in social activities. Later, he became the Ishvar foundation and Durga Mata Bahu founder, which provides free education and food to poor, underprivileged children.

Work 
He is founder of charitable trust like Sanjay Bhau Mitra Mandal, Ishwar Pratishthan, Ishwar Deshmukh foundation. These trust organize workshop of self-employment creation workshops, women safety workshops and provide education and training to poor and backward class children and women.

His own trust "Sanjaybhau Mitra Mandal" always stays prepared for activities like blood donation camps, food donation, distribution of necessary items to the needy, health camps for the elderly.

References 

 About Sanjay Bhau desgmukh:My neta,info
 Election:Sanjay Bhau Deshmukh
 General Election detail
 Sanjay Bhau Deshmukh Election Result

1968 births
Living people
Members of the Maharashtra Legislative Assembly
Ministry of Youth Affairs and Sports
People from Kalaburagi district
Marathi politicians